Coleophora ordinaria is a moth of the family Coleophoridae. It is found in South Africa.

References

Endemic moths of South Africa
ordinaria
Moths described in 1913
Moths of Africa